Queensway is a London Underground station on the Central line in Bayswater, just inside the boundary of the City of Westminster with the Royal Borough of Kensington and Chelsea. It is at the junction of Queensway and Bayswater Road, and is opposite the north-west corner of Kensington Gardens.

History
It opened on 30 July 1900, as Queen's Road, and was renamed on 1 September 1946. The building is an unusual survivor of the buildings designed for the Central London Railway by Harry Bell Measures, with a flat roof so that commercial development could take place above – in this case, a hotel. The Coburg hotel opened in 1907: its design features three cupolas, over shops and Queensway station.

The station today
There is a crossover east of the station to allow trains to terminate there. The crossover is not often used.

Refurbishment
The station was closed between 8 May 2005 and 14 June 2006 for refurbishment. These works were prompted by the need to replace the station's two (very old) lifts, which had been breaking down quite frequently prior to the station's closure. In addition the station had been modernised and re-tiled, as well as having replicas of the original lamps fitted to the façade.

Metronet, the private maintenance contractors, were originally given a deadline of 9 May 2006 to complete the works. When they failed to meet this or the revised 12 June deadline, Transport for London issued a harshly worded press release quoting London Underground Managing Director Tim O'Toole as saying "This is a further, and one hopes final, pathetic delay on a project that Metronet has failed to manage to time." The station finally re-opened on 14 June 2006.

While the two stations are in close proximity, they are not connected.

Connections
London Buses routes 70, 94, 148 and night route N207 serve the station.

Gallery

References

Central line (London Underground) stations
London Underground Night Tube stations
Tube stations in the City of Westminster
Former Central London Railway stations
Railway stations in Great Britain opened in 1900